Balpha Lonnie Noojin (August 10, 1885 – September 7, 1950) was an American sports coach, educator, politician, and businessman. Noojin completed his education at the University of Alabama, earning a Bachelor of Science degree in 1908. At Alabama, Noojin was associate editor of the student newspaper and annual and a member of the university's baseball team. Along with these groups he was also member of the Alpha Kappa chapter of Phi Kappa Sigma social fraternity. Following graduation, he played baseball briefly for the Cincinnati Reds. Noojin then moved from baseball to education.

Education
Noojin was born in Attalla, Alabama.  He taught at the Agricultural School in Blountsville and Albertville. In Albertville, he met Willie Lucille McNaron, and married her in 1916. Noojin served as director of athletics at Howard College. At the University of Alabama, Noojin coached both baseball and basketball and served as athletic director and instructor of English, French, Spanish, physics, and chemistry

Business
In 1919, he resigned from the University to join his brother in the hardware business. The Noojin brothers operated a hardware store until 1923, when they founded the Noojin Supply Company. Three years later, Noojin bought his brother's interest and managed the company on his own. Noojin became active in a number of civic activities. He was on the board of directors of the American National Bank of Gadsden, Alabama Power Company and the Gadsden Chamber of Commerce. Noojin was the president of the National Alumni Association and member of the Board of Trustees of The University of Alabama.

Inducted into the Alabama Business Hall of Fame (1979)

Politics
Noojin was also an active politician, serving on the Republican State Committee and the Republican National Convention.

Delegate to Republican National Convention from Alabama, 1924 (alternate), 1932, 1940, 1944, 1948
Member, Republican National Committee from Alabama, 1940–1943
Chairman, Alabama Republican Party, 1928–1931

Coaching

Baseball
Noojin led the Crimson Tide to five Southern Intercollegiate Athletic Conference (SIAA) titles in his six-year tenure. He compiled a 70–20 (.778) overall record coaching on the diamond.

Basketball
Lonnie Noojin coached the Alabama men's basketball team for a single season in 1918 to a 2–5 (.286) record

Football
From 1912 through 1914, Noojin was head football coach at Howard College (now Samford University). During his tenure as head coach, Noojin compiled an overall record of 10–13–2. He later served as an assistant coach at Alabama, and was to serve as head coach for the 1918 season prior to its cancellation due to the effects of World War I.

Head coaching record

Football

References

External links
 

1885 births
1950 deaths
Alabama Crimson Tide athletic directors
Alabama Crimson Tide baseball coaches
Alabama Crimson Tide football coaches
Alabama Crimson Tide men's basketball coaches
Basketball coaches from Alabama
Samford Bulldogs baseball coaches
Samford Bulldogs football coaches
University of Alabama alumni
Alabama Republicans
People from Etowah County, Alabama